John Webb may refer to:

Politics and law
John Webb (died 1795) (1730–1795), English politician
J. Griswold Webb (John Griswold Webb, 1890–1934), New York politician
John C. Webb (1915–2000), Virginia lawyer and politician
John Webb (judge) (1926–2008), Associate Justice of the North Carolina Supreme Court
John Richmond Webb (judge) (1721–1766), English lawyer, Member of Parliament and Welsh judge

Sports
John Webb (athlete) (born 1936), British Olympic athlete
John Webb (footballer) (born 1952), English former professional footballer
John Webb (baseball) (born 1979), Major League Baseball player
John Webb (rower) (1930–2006), South African Olympic rower
John Webb (paediatrician) (1918–2010), English cricketer and paediatrician

Other
John Webb (architect) (1611–1672), English architect
John Richmond Webb (1667–1724), Army officer
John Webb (landscape designer) (1754–1828), English landscape designer; partner of William Emes
John Joshua Webb (1847–1882), American outlaw
John Stanley Webb (1920–2002), English transport historian
Jack Webb (novelist) (1916–2008), mystery writer
Jack Webb (John Randolph Webb, 1920–1982), creator and star of Dragnet
John Webb (composer) (born 1969), English composer
John G. Webb, Canadian cardiologist, professor at the University of British Columbia
John Percival Webb, commissioner on the Melbourne Harbour Trust in Melbourne, Australia

See also
John Beavor-Webb (1849–1927), Irish naval architect
John Webbe (disambiguation)
John Webb's Mill, Thaxted, Thaxted, Essex, England
Jonathan Webb (born 1963), English rugby union player